Music from and Inspired by Spider-Man 3 is a soundtrack album to Sam Raimi's 2007 film Spider-Man 3. It was released on May 1, 2007. A special edition version is available only on the soundtrack's official website. A digital edition of the album is also in the planning stages, with the release date to be announced. The soundtrack's website allows the user to listen to the first song from the soundtrack. Unlike the first two Spider-Man soundtrack releases, the album does not feature any of the film's score by Christopher Young. The entire concept of this soundtrack is that each song was written (or recorded in the case of The Flaming Lips) for the soundtrack exclusively, with the exception of Chubby Checker's 1960 hit "The Twist".

The special edition of the album is available only on the soundtrack's website, and it contains a bonus track (the "Theme from Spider-Man" covered by The Flaming Lips), a 32-page embossed hardcover book featuring movie stills and all five collectable movie cards inside 8"x8" box made from a replica of the rubberized black Spider-Man suit.

Additionally, the digital version was made available for pre-order on iTunes and does contain "The Theme from Spider-Man" by The Flaming Lips.

Following its release, the soundtrack debuted at number 33 on the U.S. Billboard 200, selling about 21,000 copies in its first week.

Track listing

Notes
The European version of the album features the track "Cut Off the Top (Timo Maas Dirty Rocker Remix)" by Beatsteaks. It is 3:03 long and appears as the fifth track, between "Pleased to Meet You" and "Red River".
The album does not include the James Brown song "People Get Up and Drive Your Funky Soul", which is played in the film during the scene in which Peter, under the influence of the alien symbiote, struts and dances in the street.
In the deluxe version of the album contains the Spider-Man Theme Song made by the band The Flaming Lips. Flaming Lips also made the song 'The Supreme Being Teaches Spider-Man How To Be In Love'

Chart positions

See also

References

External links

2007 soundtrack albums
2000s film soundtrack albums
Albums produced by Dave Sardy
Spider-Man film soundtracks
Spider-Man (2002 film series)
Record Collection albums